The 1946 Wisconsin State Teachers College Conference football season was the season of college football played by the member schools of the Wisconsin State Teachers College Conference (WSTCC) as part of the 1946 college football season. The conference had existed since 1913 and, during the 1946, was divided into Northern and Southern Divisions. Superior State, led by head coach Ted Whereatt, won the Northern Division championship and compiled an overall record of 2–1–3. Milwaukee State had both the best offensive and defensive records in the conference.

Conference overview

Northern Division

Southern Division

Northern Division teams

Superior State
The 1946 Superior State Yellowjackets football team represented Superior State Teachers College (now known as University of Wisconsin–Superior) in the Wisconsin State Teachers College Conference (WSTCC) during the 1946 college football season. Led by head coach Ted Whereatt, the Yellowjackets compiled a 2–1–3 record (1–0–3 against WSTCC opponents, won the WSTCC Northern Division championship, and outscored opponents by a total of 71 to 46.

River Falls State
The 1946 River Falls Falcons football team represented River Falls State Teachers College (now known as University of Wisconsin–River Falls) in the Wisconsin State Teachers College Conference (WSTCC) during the 1946 college football season. Led by head coach George K. Schlagenhauf, the Falcons compiled a 4–2–2 record (2–1–1 against WSTCC opponents), placed second in the WSTCC Northern Division, and outscored opponents by a total of 96 to 69.

Stout Institute
The 1946 Stout Institute Blue Devils football team represented Stout Institute (now known as University of Wisconsin–Stout) in the Wisconsin State Teachers College Conference (WSTCC) during the 1946 college football season. Led by head coach Ray C. Johnson, the Blue Devils compiled a 2–2–2 record (1–1–2 against WSTCC opponents), finished third in the WSTCC Northern Division, and were outscored by a total of 77 to 47.

Eau Claire State
The 1946 Eau Claire State Blugolds football team represented Eau Clarie State Teachers College (now known as University of Wisconsin–Eau Claire) in the Wisconsin State Teachers College Conference (WSTCC) during the 1946 college football season. Led by head coach Cliff Fagan, the Blugolds compiled a 3–2–2 record (1–2–1 against WSTCC opponents), placed fourth in the WSTCC Northern Division, and outscored opponents by a total of 92 to 42.

La Crosse State

Southern Division teams

Stevens Point State
The 1946 Stevens Point Pointers football team represented Central State Teachers College (now known as University of Wisconsin–Stevens Point) in the Wisconsin State Teachers College Conference (WSTCC) during the 1946 college football season. Led by head coach George R. Berg, the Pointers compiled a 3–2–1 record (3–1 against WSTCC opponents), tied for the WSTCC Southern Division championship, and were outscored by a total of 108 to 64.

Milwaukee State
The 1946 Milwaukee State Green Gulls football team represented Wisconsin State Teachers College-Milwaukee (now known as University of Wisconsin–Milwaukee) in the Wisconsin State Teachers College Conference (WSTCC) during the 1946 college football season. Led by head coach Herman Kluge, the Green Gulls compiled a 3–3–1 record (3–1 against WSTCC opponents), tied for the WSTCC Southern Division championship, and outscored opponents by a total of 102 to 80.

Platteville State

Oshkosh State

Whitewater State
The 1946 Whitewater State Quakers football team represented Whitewater State Teachers College (now known as University of Wisconsin–Whitewater) in the Wisconsin State Teachers College Conference (WSTCC) during the 1946 college football season. Led by head coach Ed Schwager, the Quakers compiled an 0–6 record (0–5 against WSTCC opponents), finished last in the WSTCC Southern Division, and were outscored by a total of 98 to 39.

References